El Maniel (haven) is the name given to high places (mountains) by runaway slaves in La Hispaniola. The slaves chose the high sierras to hide because the hiking difficulty of those places. The city of San José de Ocoa was founded by these slaves. Also, there's another place called El Maniel, near Neyba in the southwestern part of the Dominican Republic.

Populated places in the Dominican Republic